James Scawen  (1734–1801) was a British politician who sat in the House of Commons from  1761 to 1780.
 
Scawen was the son of Thomas Scawen MP and his wife Tryphena Russell, daughter of Lord James Russell of Maidwell, Northamptonshire. Scawen's family came from Cornwall, and had an interest at Mitchell. His grandfather Thomas Scawen and great-uncle William Scawen were wealthy merchants in London and acquired large estates in Surrey including Carshalton Park which his father inherited. He succeeded his father to these estates in 1774.

In 1761 Scawen was nominated by his father for Mitchell, and was returned as Member of Parliament for Mitchell unopposed in the  1761 general election.   He was returned for Mitchell again at the 1768 general election  but after a contest. His only reported speech in the House was on 25 March 1771 when he said he had only with difficulty escaped from the mob surrounding the House, which had pressed him to say which way he would vote. He added “That was not to be asked me without or within these walls. I came an independent man into this House”

Scawen attended the Surrey county meeting of October 1774, without intending to be a candidate; but was persuaded to stand for Surrey in the 1774 general election with the support of the leading interests in the county, in order to keep out Sir Joseph Mawbey. Scawen did not stand again for Surrey in 1780, and appears to have made no other attempt to re-enter Parliament. 

The Scawens developed Carshalton Park in the 18th century including an early grotto and canals that fed mills nearby. There were apparently financial difficulties and Scawen began to sell some of his Surrey property in 1774, shortly after succeeding his father, and during the next few years mortgaged or sold more of it, until in 1781 his remaining estates were disposed of by the trustees in whom they were finally vested. Scawen died on  7 January 1801.

References

Sources

1734 births
1801 deaths
British MPs 1761–1768
British MPs 1768–1774
British MPs 1774–1780
Members of the Parliament of Great Britain for English constituencies